Godfrey of Fontaines (born sometime before 1250, died 29 October 1306 or 1309), in Latin Godefridus de Fontibus, was a scholastic philosopher and theologian, designated by the title Doctor Venerandus. He made contributions to a diverse range of subjects ranging from moral philosophy to epistemology. However, he is best known today for his work on metaphysics.

Early biography 

Godfrey was born sometime before 1250 in the principality of Liège in present-day Belgium. He was likely born at Fontaines-les-Hozémont, a château owned by his noble family.

Formation 

Godfrey was a student at the University of Paris by at least 1277, but more probably as early as 1270, as he was likely there during the second regency of Thomas Aquinas (1269-1272) who had returned to Paris from the Santa Sabina studium provinciale.  Aquinas' teaching was perhaps the strongest influence on Godfrey's own thought, though he differed on issues such as the principle of individuation, and the distinction between essence and existence in material things.  A notebook from his student years has been dated around 1271 to 1274 demonstrating his familiarity with views proposed by Siger of Brabant and Boethius of Dacia, leading representatives of the radical Aristotelian movement in the Arts faculty at the time.

Career 

He was a "Magister", or Master of Theology at the University of Paris by at least 1285 because that is when he gave his first Quodlibet, which means he had earned his Magister regens in Theology by this time and because one would have to be at least thirty-five for this honor; this offers the reasoning that his year of birth is 1250 or earlier. He was Magister regens from 1285 to 1299 and then again in 1303 to 1304. Godfrey was held in high esteem during his life, and held a number of ecclesiastical offices, including Canon of Liège, Canon of Tournai, Provost of St. Severin in Cologne (1287–1295), and possibly Canon of Paris. In 1300 he was chosen to be the Bishop of Tournai, but he chose not to take the position due to a contested election. Godfrey left Paris between his final Quodlibet in 1298-1299 and 1303/1304 yet returned before he died on 29 October 1306 or 1309. He had compiled a large library during his lifetime, which he donated to the Sorbonne upon his death; a portion of which is still intact.

Writings 

The most significant of Godfrey's writings are transcriptions of Quodlibets, of which he participated in fifteen during his tenure at the University of Paris. These were week-long sessions held before Christmas and Easter in which participating Masters were required to answer questions chosen by their students.
This was taxing to the Master, who would have to argue a thoughtful and researched answer on an incredibly diverse range of subjects. Many Masters chose not to engage in the Quodlibets. Godfrey of Fontaines completed at least fifteen Quodlibetal sessions. Hence, Godfrey discussed a very wide range of issues.
These and other writings show him to have been not merely a distinguished theologian and philosopher, but also a canonist, jurist, moralist, and conversationalist, who took an active part in the various ecclesiastical, doctrinal, and disciplinary disputes that stirred Paris at that period.
Godfrey was reportedly influenced by Thomas Aquinas, and was a defender of Thomism against his contemporaries. Thomism was a novel theory at the time, and was condemned by Étienne Tempier, Bishop of Paris (Condemnation of 1277), and opposed by John Peckham and many others. This is despite Godfrey attacking the mendicant orders throughout his career, whereas Aquinas was a member of the Dominican mendicant order. Wippel says Godfrey opposed the mendicant orders due to the belief that "those who had confessed to mendicants by reason of the privileges granted to the latter by Pope Martin's bull were still bound to confess the same sins once again to their own priests."

One of Godfrey's largest contributions was to the field of metaphysics. He was opposed to platonic arguments advanced from his contemporaries, such as Henry of Ghent. For example, he argued against the concept of platonic ideal forms, and that something's essential substance and existence were one and the same. His philosophy was strongly influenced by Aristotle.
In the Quodlibetal VIII, Godfrey argues against the Franciscan Christian order and lays an early groundwork of political philosophy where he discusses the ideas of natural rights. Godfrey believed that natural law was dependent on individual self-preservation rather than a religious obligation; he says “because by natural law each person is obliged to maintain his life…each person has dominion and a certain right in the common exterior goods of this world, a right that he cannot licitly renounce”, says author Jussi Varkemma as noted in Conrad Summenhart’s Theory of Individual Rights. He objects that the fundamental Franciscan approach to rights is illicit to human activity and natural rights. He says later that everyone has a right to subsistence - a right that people can never renounce. This applies to the mendicant orders because it applies to all members of society.

Stephen D. Dumont quotes Godfrey, in the book Philosophical Debates at Paris in the Early 14th Century, that" “Medieval sources are nearly unanimous in identifying Godfrey as a prominent source for the unusual but very influential account of intention and remission known as the "succession of forms"." As explained by Dumont, intension and remission of forms concerns the problem of a change of degree within a given kind of quality, like the shading of a color, adjustment of heat or even the altering of moral or cognitive habits. Godfrey held the position that all specific forms are “in their nature indivisible, invariable, and lacking in degrees” (43) and “the specific form of a quality in itself does not undergo any intension or remission but does so insofar as it is individuated in a subject.” This line of thought differs drastically from other thinkers around this time like Thomas Aquinas and Henry of Ghent, who held that there was a variation of specific forms which are divisible extensions. Godfrey refutes their claims through the reasoning that because qualities cannot change in degree because they are indivisible, then they must change insofar as they are individuals, so he concludes that a “change in degree in an individual quality will also be a change of the individual itself, even when its species remains the same”.

Nine other noteworthy topics that Godfrey wrote about in the Quodlibetal are Subject of metaphysics, Division of being, Analogy of being, Transcendentals, Essence and existence, Knowledge of God’s existence and essence, Eternity of the world, Substance and accidents, and Abstraction.

Influence 

The XIV Quodlibeta of Godfrey, extensively studied and multiplied in manuscript form in the medieval schools, were published for the first time at the beginning of the 20th century. A critical edition of the first four of them appeared in the series "Les Philosophes Belges, Textes et Etudes" (II, "Les quatre premiers Quodlibets de Godefroid de Fontaines", by de Wulf and Pelzer, Louvain, 1904). 

Sometime in the 14th century, Godfrey, though well known in his own time, fell out of favour into near-total obscurity. Thomas Aquinas sparked plenty of controversy and discussion in philosophy and theology in the last quarter century of the  13th century. Many significant writers lived during this period, but for the most part, until the 20th century only Thomas Aquinas and Duns Scotus received any recognition. Godfrey may have been just as significant in his own time as these two, yet for some reason his works were only edited and published as of the early 20th century. This may have more to do with his political affiliation than anything else. Religious Scholars of this time became well known in the long run based mainly on how well promoted they were by the mendicant orders. Thomas Aquinas was promoted by the Dominican order, and Duns Scotus was promoted by the Franciscan order. Despite this, Godfrey of Fontaines' writings had, by the 1960s, regained much popularity.

References

Sources 
 Wippel, John. Godfrey of Fontaines, The Stanford Encyclopedia of Philosophy (Fall 2001 Edition).

Further reading 

 De Wulf, M. (1904). Un théologien-philosophe du XIIIe siècle. Étude sur la vie, les oeuvres et l'influence de Godefroid de Fontaines. Brussels: M. Hayez.
 Duin, J.J. (1959). La bibliothèque philosophique de Godefroid de Fontaines, Estudios Lulianos 3, pp. 21–36, 136-60.
 Marrone, S. (2001). The Light of Thy Countenance. Science and Knowledge of God in the Thirteenth Century. Vol. 2: God at the Core of Cognition. Leiden: Brill.
 Putallaz, F.X. (1995). Insolente liberté. Controverses et condemnations au XIIIe siècle. Fribourg: Éditions Universitaires/Paris: Éditions du Cerf.

 Wippel, J.F. (1984). Possible Sources for Godfrey of Fontaines' Views on the Act-Potency Composition of Simple Creatures, Mediaeval Studies 44 (1984), pp. 222–44.
 Wippel, J.F. (1986). The Role of the Phantasm in Godfrey of Fontaines' Theory of Intellection, in C. Wenin, ed., L'homme et son univers au moyen âge (Actes du septième congrès internationale de philosophie médiévale [30 Août-4 Septembre 1982]), Vol. 2, pp. 573–82.
 Wippel, J.F. (2001). Godfrey of Fontaines at the University of Paris in the Last Quarter of the Thirteenth Century, in J.A. Aertsen, K. Emery, Andreas Speer, eds., Nach der Verurteilung von 1277. Philosophie und Theologie an der Universität von Paris im letzten Viertel des 13. Jahrhunderts. Studien und Texte (Miscellanea Mediaevalia, 28) Berlin-New York: Walter de Gruyter, pp. 359–89.

13th-century births
1300s deaths
Year of birth unknown
Year of death uncertain
Catholic philosophers
Scholastic philosophers
French Christian theologians
Prince-Bishopric of Liège clergy
13th-century philosophers
13th-century French philosophers